Walter Martin Watkins (21 March 1880 – 14 May 1942) was a Welsh footballer who played in the Football League for Aston Villa, Stoke and Sunderland.

Club career
Watkins was born in Caersws and was one of six sons of a Welsh farmer from Llanwnnog in Montgomeryshire. Along with his elder brother Ernie, Mart played for his local club, Oswestry Town where he was spotted by Football League side Stoke. He signed in August 1900 and with the "Potters" awful start to the 1900–01 season – one point from the first seven games – ensured a rapid entrance to first team football. Tall and slim with a neat moustache, Watkins was described as a 'smart player', possessing a whiplash shot who pass to his winger before dashing back into the penalty area to launch himself at the ensuing cross.

Watkins helped Stoke avoid relegation in 1900–01, scoring the winning goal in the team's last three matches. In 1901–02 he finished top scorer with 16 and repeated the feat with 13 in 1902–03 which earned him some Welsh caps. In January 1904 Manchester City offered Stoke £450 for Watkins' services. The deal collapsed, but with Stoke desperate for funds following the construction of a new stand Aston Villa manager George Ramsey signed Watkins for a 'high price' joining up with former Stoke winger Arthur Lockett.

His career at Villa Park didn't last long after playing just six matches scoring once, ironically against Stoke, he signed for Sunderland in October 1904. Watkins made his debut for Sunderland on 22 October 1904 in a 3–0 defeat against Sheffield Wednesday at Roker Park where he scored two goals. Over his career at the club, he made 15 league appearances scoring nine goals.

Watkins then joined the newly formed Crystal Palace in the Southern Football League Division Two, helping them win the league and gain promotion to the First Division, scoring six goals in 15 league appearances and in the FA Cup netting six from six appearances. Watkins then moved to Northampton Town then in 1907 he rejoined Stoke who at the time were on the brink of bankruptcy. He scored five goals in 20 matches as a Stoke endured a terrible 1907–08 which saw the supporters abandon the team and the club entered liquidation, resigning from the Football League in the process. Watkins then played for Crewe Alexandra followed by moves to Stafford Rangers and Tunstall Park. Watkins did return to Stoke in 1911 but failed to win a contract and decided to retire from football.

International career
Watkins played ten times for the Wales national team scoring four goals. In July 2021 Watkins' Welsh cap from 1905 was donated to the Football Museum for Wales by the Watkins family who had emigrated to Australia.

Career statistics

Club
Source:

International
Source:

References

1880 births
1942 deaths

Welsh footballers
Wales international footballers
English Football League players
Southern Football League players
Stoke City F.C. players
Aston Villa F.C. players
Crystal Palace F.C. players
Northampton Town F.C. players
Crewe Alexandra F.C. players
Stafford Rangers F.C. players
Sunderland A.F.C. players
Caersws F.C. players
Association football forwards